David 'Dai' Maddocks (born is 20 January 1983, Haverfordwest) is a Wales Under 21 international rugby union player. A prop forward, he made 26 appearances for the Welsh regional team Newport Gwent Dragons and also represented the Scarlets. He previously played for Llanelli RFC, Bedwas RFC, Coventry RFC and Newport RFC.

Maddocks joined Jersey in June 2010 and was released by the club in May 2012

References

External links
Newport Gwent Dragons profile

1983 births
Living people
Dragons RFC players
Jersey Reds players
Llanelli RFC players
Newport RFC players
Rugby union players from Haverfordwest
Scarlets players
Welsh rugby union players